Mackenzie High School may refer to:

Mackenzie High School (Guyana)
Mackenzie High School (Michigan)
McKenzie High School, a high school in Finn Rock, Oregon
Mackenzie High School (Deep River), a high school in Ontario
Fort Mackenzie High School, in Sheridan, Wyoming